Rosa (minor planet designation: 223 Rosa) is a large Themistian asteroid. It is classified as a combination of C-type and P-type asteroids, so it is probably composed of carbonaceous material rich in water ice. It was discovered by Johann Palisa on 9 March 1882, in Vienna. The origin of the name is not known.

Photometric observations made in 2011–2012 at the Organ Mesa Observatory in Las Cruces, New Mexico, produced a light curve with a period of 20.283 ± 0.002 hours and a brightness variation of 0.13 ± 0.02 in magnitude. The curve has two asymmetrical maxima and minima per 20.283-hour cycle.

The spacecraft JUICE is planned to pass through the asteroid belt twice, and a flyby of 223 Rosa has been proposed. If selected, JUICE would make its nearest approach on 15 October 2029.

References

External links 
 Lightcurve plot of 223 Rosa, Palmer Divide Observatory, B. D. Warner (2007)
 Asteroid Lightcurve Database (LCDB), query form (info )
 Dictionary of Minor Planet Names, Google books
 Asteroids and comets rotation curves, CdR – Observatoire de Genève, Raoul Behrend
 Discovery Circumstances: Numbered Minor Planets (1)-(5000) – Minor Planet Center
 
 

000223
Discoveries by Johann Palisa
Named minor planets
000223
18820309